Eduardo Restrepo may refer to:
Eduardo Restrepo Sáenz (1886–1955), Colombian lawyer and historian
Eduardo Restrepo Victoria (born 1958), Colombian drug trafficker